Caryocolum amaurella is a moth of the family Gelechiidae. It is found in Denmark, Fennoscandia, Germany, Austria, Switzerland, Italy, Estonia, Latvia, the Czech Republic, Slovakia, former Yugoslavia, Hungary, Greece, Ukraine and Russia. It is also present in Turkey. The species is restricted to warm and sunny habitats such as dry meadows and pastures from lowland localities to about 2,200 meters in the Alps.

The length of the forewings is 5–6 mm. The forewings are blackish, with scattered white and brown scales particularly along the dorsal margin and across the first quarter and middle. Adults have been recorded on wing from late June to late September.

The larvae feed on Lychnis viscaria. They initially feed between spun terminal shoots, but later feed within the stem. Larvae can be found in April and May.

References

Moths described in 1924
amaurella
Moths of Europe
Moths of Asia